Fescennia or Fescennium was an ancient city of Etruscan/Faliscan origin, which is probably to be placed immediately to the north of the modern Corchiano,  north west of Civita Castellana, in central Italy. The Via Amerina traverses it. At the Riserva S. Silvestro, walls exist. At Corchiano itself, however, similar walls may be traced, and the site is a strong and characteristic triangle between two deep ravines, with the third (west) side cut off by a ditch. Here, too, remains of two bridges may be seen, and several rich tombs have been excavated.

The term Fescennine Verses refers to a certain kind of drinking song popular at festivals in ancient Rome and elsewhere. According to Festus, these songs were introduced from Fescennia, but others have thought that there is no reason to assume that any particular town was especially devoted to the use of such songs.

Fescennia's warriors are also mentioned in Book VII of Virgil's Aeneid as following Messapus, the 'Steed Tamer' in the war waged by Turnus against Aeneas.

References

 Sources
 

 Attribution
  This work in turn cites:
 A. Buglione, “Conte di Monale,” in Römische Mitteilungen (1887), p. 21 seq.

Etruscan sites
Former populated places in Italy
Falisci
Italic archaeological sites